Stanisław Michał Ubysz (also Michał Stanisław Ubysz) (died after 1676) - chorąży (ensign) of Gostyń, member of parliament (sejm walny) of Polish–Lithuanian Commonwealth.

He was elected as a member of parliament in 1666 and also in 1672. As a supporter of king Michał Korybut Wiśniowiecki on 20 June 1672 broke Sejm. In 1676 he was an elector of Jan III Sobieski.

Notes

References 

Members of the Sejm of the Polish–Lithuanian Commonwealth